Lauro Puñales (English: Lauro Daggers) is a 1969 historical drama film directed by René Cardona, and starring Antonio Aguilar, Flor Silvestre, and Jaime Fernández.

Plot
In Emiliano Zapata's hometown of Anenecuilco lives Lauro Puñales, a famous revolutionary leader and agrarian. The town's political boss and municipal president are confidants to the federals. The political boss urges the peasants to give him back the lands that they took from them, albeit Lauro defends the peasants and also promotes the revolutionary cause. He is in love with Rosenda, a widow and daughter of notable citizen Damián Rodríguez.

Cast
Antonio Aguilar – Lauro González 
Flor Silvestre – Rosenda Rodríguez
Alma Delia Fuentes – Teresa Rodríguez
Elsa Cárdenas – María Elena Rodríguez
Carlos López Moctezuma – don Damián Rodríguez
Eleazar García – Juvencio (as Eleazar García 'Chelelo')
Alejandro Reyna – Albino (as Alejandro Reyna 'Tio Placido')
Jaime Fernández – Emiliano Zapata
Carlos Cortés – Capitan Luis Bermúdez
Julián Pastor – Carlos Reyes
Miguel Ángel Ferriz – General Bermúdez
Guillermo Rivas – Saturnino López
Jorge Russek – Coronel Villegas
Arturo Martínez – don Leobardo Nochebuena
Agustín Isunza – doctor
Joaquín Martínez – Matías	
Manuel Garay
René Barrera

External links

1969 films
Mexican Revolution films
1960s Spanish-language films
Mexican historical drama films
1960s historical drama films
Films about Emiliano Zapata
1969 drama films
1960s Mexican films